The 8th Asian Film Awards are the 2014 edition of the Asian Film Awards. The ceremony was held in Macau.

Winners and nominees
Winners are listed first and highlighted in bold.

References

External links

Asian Film Awards ceremonies
2013 film awards
2014 in Macau
Film
Hong Kong